Padauva is a village in Jagat block, Budaun district, Uttar Pradesh, India. It is administrated by Gram Panchayat. Budaun railway station is 5 km from the village. According to the 2011 Census of India, its population was 1914, with 1009 males and 905 females.

References

Villages in Budaun district